Hubert Griessmaier is an Austrian para-alpine skier. He represented Austria at the 1980 Winter Paralympics and at the 1988 Winter Paralympics.

He won the silver medal at the Men's Slalom 3A event at the 1980 Winter Paralympics.

See also 
 List of Paralympic medalists in alpine skiing

References 

Living people
Year of birth missing (living people)
Place of birth missing (living people)
Paralympic alpine skiers of Austria
Alpine skiers at the 1980 Winter Paralympics
Alpine skiers at the 1988 Winter Paralympics
Medalists at the 1980 Winter Paralympics
Paralympic silver medalists for Austria
Paralympic medalists in alpine skiing
20th-century Austrian people